The Field of Stars is a 2007 Spanish drama film written and directed by Mario Camus which stars Álvaro de Luna, Marián Aguilera, José Manuel Cervino, Antonio de la Torre, Rodolfo Sancho, and Mari González. It is Camus' swan song.

Plot 
Set in rural Cantabria, the plot tracks several intertwined stories, including an elder man (Alfonso) paying visits to Nanda, who lives in a geriatric centre and the budding cycling talent of young Martín (brother of Luisa, an independent woman and social worker in the aforementioned geriatric centre who falls romantically for Ramiro, a mechanic). Martín is helped by Alfonso and his pal Tasio in order to fulfill his potential.

Cast

Production 
The screenplay was penned by Mario Camus. The film was produced by Cre-Acción Films alongside 2 y 4 Films and Proverfilms. Filming began on 16 October 2006 and wrapped in December 2006. Shooting locations included Cantabria (Comillas, Santander, Torrelavega, Valderredible, Cabuérniga, portillo de Lunada, and ) and the Province of Palencia (comarca of Aguilar de Campoo).

Release 
The film was selected for screening at the official selection of the 52nd Valladolid International Film Festival, where it premiered on 1 November 2007. It was theatrically released in Spain on 11 January 2008.

Reception 
Jonathan Holland of Variety deemed the film to be "an understated, cross-generational rural drama whose general air of lethargy is redeemed by a decent central perf and the beauty of its locations", in which the director "plays out its themes of emotional uncertainty, memory and loss to unconvincing effect".

Carlos Marañón of Cinemanía rated the film 3 out of 5 stars, positively pointing out that what in advance appeared to be a "tourism advertorial" paid by the Cantabrian government turns out to be simple story of well-performed solitudes, with an open ending.

Accolades 

|-
| rowspan = "2" align = "center" | 2008 
| rowspan = "2" | 22nd Goya Awards || Best Actor || Álvaro de Luna ||  || rowspan = "2" | 
|-
| Best New Actor || Óscar Abad ||  
|-
| rowspan = "2" align = "center" | 2009
| rowspan = "2" | 64th CEC Medals || Best Director || Mario Camus ||  || rowspan = "2" | 
|-
| Best Original Screenplay || Mario Camus || 
|}

See also 
 List of Spanish films of 2008

References 

Spanish drama films
2000s Spanish-language films
Cycling films
Films shot in Cantabria
Films shot in the province of Palencia
Films set in Cantabria
Spanish sports films
2000s Spanish films